François Coulomb the Elder was a French naval architect and builder of warships (ingénieur-constructeur), the son of Laurent Coulomb. François Coulomb was born on 24 January 1654 at La Ciotat, and died on 20 March 1717 at Toulon. He was first known on the archives under the name of "Coulomb fils" because he collaborated with his father, Laurent Coulomb, in constructing naval ships; then he became "François père" because his own son, also named François, worked in collaboration with him. In 1680, he occupied himself with the school of construction at Toulon, and wrote a manual of construction. He took the place of his father at Toulon, when the latter was named constructor at Lorient in 1690. In the course of his career he designed and built at Toulon 34 ships for the King of France, plus 2 ships for the Order of Saint John of Jerusalem (the Knights of Malta).

Ships of the line designed and built by François Coulomb the Elder

In addition, two ships of 64 guns each were built between 1702 and 1704 for the Order of Saint John of Jerusalem (the Knights of Malta); these ships were the San Giovanni Battista and the San Giacomo.

Lesser warships designed and built by François Coulomb the Elder

The above list does not include a variety of small craft designed and built by François Coulomb - the three feluccas Félouque (1691), Légère (1694) and Ferme (1695); the barques Légère (1703), Prompte (1703), Sainte Claire (1703), Subtile (1703) and Vigilante (1703); the brigantines Fidèle (1705) and Ferme (1705); also the cargo ships (gabarres) Caillé, Perdrix, Alouette and Fauvette, all four launched in 1717 to a design by Coulomb but not built by him.

References

Bibliography

Nomenclature des Vaisseaux du Roi-Soleil de 1661 a 1715. Alain Demerliac (Editions Omega, Nice – various dates).
The Sun King's Vessels (2015) - Jean-Claude Lemineur; English translation by François Fougerat. Editions ANCRE.  
Winfield, Rif and Roberts, Stephen (2017) French Warships in the Age of Sail 1626-1786: Design, Construction, Careers and Fates. Seaforth Publishing. . 

French naval architects
1654 births
1717 deaths